The Nightwatchman is the solo project of American musician Tom Morello (Rage Against the Machine, Street Sweeper Social Club and former Audioslave). Morello began performing as the Nightwatchman in 2003 as an outlet for his political views while he was playing apolitical music with Audioslave.

Career

Early career
Morello created the identity of the Nightwatchman, inspired by Bruce Springsteen's The Ghost of Tom Joad album, when a desire to return to political activism in his music struck him in 2003, after over a year of playing non-activist rock in Audioslave. Morello describes The Nightwatchman as "the black Robin Hood of 21st century music" and "a reaction against illicit wars, a reaction against first strikes, torture, secret prisons, spying illegally on American citizens. It's a reaction against war crimes, and it's a reaction against a few corporations that grow rich [off] this illicit war while people beg for food in the city streets." He later elaborated that the format was inspired by long-time social and political activist/musician Billy Bragg. Morello first saw him performing at a concert c. 1994, playing "fearlessly" before a crowd of 8,000 people in a tent alongside big-name rock bands of the time. The Nightwatchman first began playing political acoustic folk music in a Los Angeles coffeehouse before a small crowd, and soon after went on Billy Bragg's Tell Us the Truth Tour.

The Tell Us the Truth Tour was supported by unions, environmental and media reform groups including Common Cause, Free Press and A.F.L.-C.I.O. with the ultimate goal of "informing music fans, and exposing and challenging the failures of the major media outlets in the United States." His Nightwatchman persona has been compared to Woody Guthrie, Bruce Springsteen and Bob Dylan. He initially had no plans to record, but later recorded the song "No One Left" for Songs and Artists that Inspired Fahrenheit 9/11. At the Festival of Bonnaroo in 2007, The Nightwatchman performed Rage Against the Machine song "Guerrilla Radio" to protest George W. Bush.

One Man Revolution

In February 2007, he announced a solo album, One Man Revolution, which was released on April 24, 2007, in the US and May 7 worldwide. The Nightwatchman's first headlining gig was played June 17, 2007, at the House of Blues in Dallas, Texas. Morello has toured since the CD was released and said he plans to tour the U.S. again in the fall. After seeing an early screening of the Michael Moore film Sicko Morello wrote the song, "Alone Without You" which featured in closing credits of the film and also with a music video directed by Moore in the DVD release. The song was also made available as an iTunes bonus track for One Man Revolution. Morello toured in support of the album as the opening act for Ben Harper During this tour, Morello joined Harper onstage on several occasions for a cover of Bob Dylan's "Masters of War", on which he plays the electric guitar in the style for which he's best known. Other prominent musicians who Morello shared the stage with during the One Man Revolution tour includes, Serj Tankian, Perry Farrell, Jon Foreman from Switchfoot, Shooter Jennings, Nuno Bettencourt, Sen Dog from Cypress Hill, Jill Sobule, Boots Riley, Alexi Murdoch, Wayne Kramer from MC5, Slash and many others.

The Fabled City
The album The Fabled City was released on September 30, 2008. Two songs off the record, "Midnight in the City of Destruction" (about New Orleans and Hurricane Katrina) and "King of Hell" (written about Guantanamo Bay detention camp), had previously been leaked on The Nightwatchman MySpace or performed during live sets.

So far The Satellite Party's Carl Restivo has been confirmed to be part of The Freedom Fighters as a second guitarist. To promote the new album Morello and the band appeared both on The Late Late Show with Craig Ferguson and on Late Night with Conan O'Brien before heading out on The Fabled City Tour, an eighteen stop tour in the United States.

World Wide Rebel Songs
To support the many unions affected by the anti-negotiation/bargaining laws due to the 2011 Wisconsin budget protests, Morello performed outside the Madison Capitol building on February 21, 2011, to rousing support. He also teamed up with fellow rock musician Wayne Kramer in support of the protesters performing the title song of his upcoming album, World Wide Rebel Songs. Kramer appears on said song on the album, performing backing vocals.

On The Nightwatchman website, it was announced that Morello has signed with the label New West Records to release his third album as The Nightwatchman moniker, World Wide Rebel Songs, due out on August 30, 2011.

Before the release of the album, Morello released an EP entitled Union Town on May 17, 2011. All proceeds of the EP sales will go to benefit The America Votes Labor Unity Fund.

In October 2011 and on May Day 2012, Morello performed in support of the protesters at Occupy LA and Occupy Wall Street.

The Freedom Fighters Orchestra
Current members
Tom Morello – lead vocals, electric and acoustic guitar (2003–present)
Carl Restivo – electric guitar, backing vocals (2008–present)
Eric Gardner – drums, backing vocals (2011–present)
Dave Gibbs – bass guitar, backing vocals (2008–present)

Former members
Flea – bass at The Late Late Show with Craig Ferguson (2008)
Breckin Meyer – drums, percussion, backing vocals (2008–2011)
Robbie Seahag Mangano – bass, backing vocals (selected performances August 2011 to September 2012, bass and guitar on "Blind Willie McTell")

Discography

Studio albums

Live album

Singles

Other appearances

References

External links

 Official Website (archived)

American folk guitarists
American male guitarists
American folk singers
American socialists
1964 births
Living people
20th-century American guitarists
20th-century American male musicians